Calicium salicinum is a crustose lichen that is found growing on trees in the South West region of Western Australia.

References

salicinum
Lichen species
Lichens described in 1794
Lichens of Australia
Taxa named by Christiaan Hendrik Persoon